Masaie (written: 正家 or 政家) is a masculine Japanese given name. Notable people with the name include:

 (1445–1505), Japanese kugyō
 (died 1348), Japanese samurai
 (1562–1600), Japanese daimyō

Japanese masculine given names